The Yngling is a sailboat that was designed by Norwegian Jan Herman Linge as a one design racer and first built in 1967.

The Yngling design is very similar to the larger 1966 Linge-designed Soling.

Production
In the past the design was built by Abbott Boats in Canada, the O'Day Corp. and Jibetech in the United States as well as Petticrows in the United Kingdom. It remains in production at Børresen Bådebyggeri in Denmark and by Mader Bootswerft in Germany.

Design

The Yngling is a racing keelboat, built predominantly of fibreglass, with wood trim. It has a fractional sloop rig with aluminum spars. The hull has a spooned raked stem, a raised counter reverse transom, an internally mounted spade-type rudder controlled by a tiller and a swept fixed fin keel. It displaces  and carries  of lead ballast.

The design has small cuddy cabin for stowage.

For sailing the design is equipped with a  spinnaker, an end-boom mainsheet, foam buoyancy and sail windows for visibility.

Operational history

The design is supported by a class club, the International Yngling Association, with national clubs in Austria, Belgium, Germany, Norway, Switzerland, Denmark, the Netherlands, Sweden, the United States and Australia.

The Yngling received ISAF International status in 1979 and was chosen as the Olympic Women's Keelboat for the 2004 and the 2008 Summer Olympics. The Yngling was replaced by the Elliott 6m for the London 2012 Summer Olympics.

In a 1994 review Richard Sherwood wrote, "Jan Linge also designed the larger Soling, and the lines are very similar ... The Yngling is highly stable, with a beam-to-waterline ratio of .37 and with 50 percent of the weight in ballast. It is unsinkable, with foam-filled tanks. Sail area is not large, so that the boat may be sailed by younger sailors. While one-design rules are strict, every effort has been made to keep the cost of allowable modifications down."

Events

See also
List of sailing boat types
Sailing at the 2004 Summer Olympics – Yngling
Sailing at the 2008 Summer Olympics – Yngling

Related development
Soling

References

External links

Børresen Bådebyggeri official website
Mader Bootswerft official website

Keelboats
1960s sailboat type designs
Sailing yachts
Yngling (keelboat)
Classes of World Sailing
Olympic sailing classes
Sailboat type designs by Jan Herman Linge
Sailboat types built by Abbott Boats
Sailboat types built by O'Day Corp.
Sailboat types built by Børresen Bådebyggeri
Sailboat types built by Jibetech
Sailboat types built by Mader Bootswerft
Sailboat types built by Petticrows